IACER - Institute of Advanced Communication, Education and Research is a researched based college situated in Kathmandu, Nepal. It is established in 2001 and it is affiliated to Pokhara University. The aim of this institute is to provide advanced research degrees in the Humanities and Social Sciences, with English Studies at the heart of the academic experience.

Courses offered
The college offers courses in
 MA and
 M. Phil

External links
 IACER.edu.np

References

Universities and colleges in Nepal
2001 establishments in Nepal
Pokhara University